KWFR (101.9 FM) is a radio station broadcasting a classic rock music format. Licensed to San Angelo, Texas, United States, the station serves the San Angelo area.  The station is currently owned by Foster Communications.

KWFR is not licensed to broadcast in HD.

History
The station was assigned the call letters KKLK on February 7, 1990.  On November 6, 1995, the station changed its call sign to the current KWFR.

References

External links

WFR
Classic rock radio stations in the United States